This is a list of electoral district results for the 1969 Queensland state election.

Results by electoral district

Albert

By-election 

 This by-election was caused by the death of Cec Carey. It was held on 14 February 1970.

Ashgrove

Aspley

Aubigny

Balonne

Barambah

Barcoo

Baroona

Belmont

Bowen

Brisbane

Bulimba

Bundaberg

Burdekin

Burke

Burnett

Cairns

Callide

Carnarvon

Chatsworth

Clayfield

Condamine

Cook

Cooroora

Cunningham

Fassifern

Flinders

Greenslopes

Gregory

Gympie

Hawthorne

Hinchinbrook

Ipswich East

Ipswich West

Isis

Ithaca

Kedron

Kurilpa

Landsborough

Lockyer

Logan

Mackay

Mackenzie

Maryborough

By-election 

 This by-election was caused by the death of Horace Davies. It was held on 24 July 1971.

Merthyr

By-election 

 This by-election was caused by the resignation of Sam Ramsden. It was held on 24 July 1971.

 Preferences were not distributed.

Mirani

Mount Coot-tha

Mount Gravatt

Mourilyan

Mulgrave

Murrumba

Norman

Nudgee

Nundah

Port Curtis

Redcliffe

Rockhampton North

Rockhampton South

Roma

Salisbury

Sandgate

Sherwood

Somerset

South Brisbane

South Coast

Tablelands

Toowong

Toowoomba East

Toowoomba West

Townsville North

Townsville South

Warrego

Warwick

Wavell

Whitsunday

Windsor

Wynnum

Yeronga

See also 

 1969 Queensland state election
 Members of the Queensland Legislative Assembly, 1969-1972

References 

Results of Queensland elections